Khalifan, is a town located in Erbil Province, Kurdistan Region in Iraq, near Rawandiz.

Its most famous places are Geli Ali Beg Waterfall and Korek mountain. Islam is the majority religion in Khalifan.

Tourism

Geli Ali Beg Waterfall 
This Promenadeis 106 km from the middle of the erbil city here, considered one of the most Tourist areas in the Kurdistan Region and Iraq . Located between Korek Mountain and Bradost Mountain, 12 km long, the site is 800 m high on sea level, its temperature reaches 31 degrees Celsius in the Summer, and (-10) in winter. There are two rivers, one coming from the Alan Valley, which forms the Gali Ali Beg Waterfall, and the other in the town of Rwanduz. Despite the large waterfall, there are many small waterfalls. This mountainous place and its various areas have become a tourist destination, where many people visit, especially in the central and southern regions of Iraq in the Summer season.

Bekhal Waterfall 
The Bekhal Waterfall (112 km) is located from the middle of the erbil city , located east of Gali Ali Beg Waterfall, 10 km west of Rwanduz town and 7 km from Khalifan. We can reach Bekhal through Gali Ali Beg or through Rwanduz. bright and large waterfall that covers its mountainside, People go there for fun from the beginning of spring to the end of summer .

Resources 

 مێژۆی خەلیفان
رێگری‌ له‌ شوێنه‌واری‌ هه‌رێم ده‌كرێت لێكۆڵینه‌وه‌ له‌ زێڕە دۆزراوه‌كه‌ی‌ خه‌لیفان بكات
 خەلیفان (raprsi.com)
 پارێزگای هەولێر
 جوگرافیای خەلیفان

References 

Populated places in Erbil Governorate
Kurdish settlements in Erbil Governorate